Urban Umpires is a domestic private stock corporation working mainly in the realm of multimedia.  It was founded in 2004 by Just Jay, who initiated Urban Umpires as a collection of entrepreneurs, DJs, producers, MCs, graffiti artists, videographers, instrumental artists, graphic designers, and the like, several years before its incorporation.

Members
Urban Umpires is most widely known for its private hip hop organization, whose members have included:

Umpires:
 Amad Jamal aka Tom Bradley
 Marc Stretch of Foreign Legion
 Cold Showda (MC)
 B-Smoove (MC)
 MoJo Swagger (MC)
 Brisk-1 (producer)
 Concise Kilgore

Senior Umpires:
 DJ Coop D'ville
 Various Blends
 Ras Cue Aka Black Burgandy/EBF (VP of Operations)
 Friz B (Bola)
 CrushDelight (VP)
 Just Jay (CEO and founder)

The Junior Umpires membership list is currently private. The only publicly known members are:
 Beatmaker B (from Russia; producer/DJ)
 Flip (from Austria; producer/DJ and promoter)
 Intro Beats (from Iceland)

Structure

Urban Umpires Incorporated was established in 2006, but the Urban Umpires Organization itself dates back several years earlier, as Urban Umpires' structure is twofold.

There are members of the organization (Umpires) currently acting as CEO and VP, as well as some who sit on the board of directors of the corporation. However, the Umpires themselves are not all involved in the corporate aspect of Urban Umpires. The subsect – or original defining body – of Urban Umpires is the Umpires Organization.

The Umpires Organization consists of select Umpires who represent Urban Umpires' interests in Urban Umpires Inc. Unofficially, Urban Umpires also includes a select group of Urban Umpires affiliates, including Hieroglyphics, DAE Recordings, Marcus Aurelius, Chocolate Sound, The Solution, Santero, Tha Fruitbat, Cali Agents (Rasco and Planet Asia), Adisa Banjoko, Dilated Peoples, and Freddie Foxxx.

Radio

Urban Umpires established itself in radio with small independent online radio broadcaster btr in 2006.  Urban Umpires' hip hop mix show The Third Rails debut made it the seventh show airing on the station's seven-day rotation at the time.

By early 2007 Urban Umpires was the largest single content provider to the broadcaster, with a total of eight original multi-genre shows, as well as artist interviews and video content. In mid-2007, Urban Umpires provided 10% of the station's total music programming content, and Umpire Just Jay was officially titled the station's Urban Platform Programming Director.

Urban Platform:
 The Third Rail - hip hop
 Bhangra Beats
 Dancehall Riddims
 Latin Hip Hop
 World Hip Hop - hip hop in world tongue
 Glitch IDM - intelligent dance music
 Electric Avenue - deep house
 Downtime Sessions - downtempo/trip-hop

At its peak the eight-show platform's audience reached over 40 million listeners weekly.

The original show, The Third Rail, aired 120 episodes, and the proceeding shows aired nearly 100 apiece. Afrika Bambatta, RZA from Wu Tang, Money B of Digital Underground, the Notorious Vic Black from the Gang Starr Foundation (who after over 20 years in the game made his DJing debut on The Third Rail) and countless others guest hosted, were interviewed for, and supported the platform of shows.

In early 2008 Just Jay collaborated with MC Opio (Souls of Mischief/Hieroglyphics) on the artist's Vultures Wisdom Vol.1 DVD via video content fabrication and production. The album was hailed as the year's hip hop standard for indie progressive urban videography and lyrical content.

Urban Umpires and MySpace both released authorized sneak peeks of the album. Myspace then released the cut version. Urban Umpires released the uncut vocal and unreleased tracks along with a personal artist interview with Opio.

The Umpires, the artists played on the platform of shows, and affiliates invested in the platform parted with the station in late 2008. The music library, the rights to play content of the library, and the entirety of the urban platform's related audio, visual and written content, remained property of Urban Umpires Inc.

Urban Umpires has moved the platform to MadMixRadio.com, which was scheduled to launch in the summer of 2010.

References

August 2006 article hails Urban Umpires The Third Rail as groundbreaking and innovative.
Article - 2006 The Third Rail Hailed.
September 2007 Gangstarr Foundations Vic Black DJing Debut on Urban Umpires The Third Rail (article)
Article - Urban Umpires Urban Programming expanded.
July 2006 Review Urban Umpires original shows bulk of total quoted programming
BTR Blog with temporary links to Urban Umpires radio shows
Bash Bros appears on The Third Rail
Article - The Third Rail
Article - Urban Umpires Music Platform

External links
Urban Umpires' official website
Urban Umpires' Myspace page
Founder's Myspace page

Hip hop groups from California
Musical groups from the San Francisco Bay Area
Hip hop collectives
Musical groups established in 2004
Musical groups established in 2006
American house music groups
Electronic music groups from California